Stu Duff (born 14 December 1962) is a New Zealand cricketer. He played in 88 first-class and 78 List A matches for Central Districts from 1985 to 1996.

See also
 List of Central Districts representative cricketers

References

External links
 

1962 births
Living people
New Zealand cricketers
Central Districts cricketers
Cricketers from Hastings, New Zealand